The 1992 NCAA Division II Men's Soccer Championship was the 21st annual tournament held by the NCAA to determine the top men's Division II college soccer program in the United States.

Southern Connecticut (21-2-1) defeated Tampa, 1–0, to win a third national title. The Fighting Owls were coached by Ray Reid.

The final match was held in Tampa, Florida on December 5, 1992.

Bracket

Final

See also  
 NCAA Division I Men's Soccer Championship
 NCAA Division III Men's Soccer Championship
 NAIA Men's Soccer Championship

References 

NCAA Division II Men's Soccer Championship
NCAA Division II Men's Soccer Championship
NCAA Division II Men's Soccer Championship
NCAA Division II Men's Soccer Championship